This is a list of years in American television.

21st century

20th century

See also 
 List of years in the United States
 List of years in television
 Lists of American films

Television
Television in the United States by year
American